Charles Rix (15 June 1891 – 21 November 1958) was a New Zealand cricketer. He played in two first-class matches for Canterbury in 1922/23.

See also
 List of Canterbury representative cricketers

References

External links
 

1891 births
1958 deaths
New Zealand cricketers
Canterbury cricketers
Sportspeople from Akaroa